CFR Title 39 - Postal Service is one of fifty titles comprising the United States Code of Federal Regulations (CFR). Title 39 is the principal set of rules and regulations  issued by federal agencies of the United States regarding postal service..

Structure 

The table of contents, as reflected in the e-CFR updated February 21, 2014, is as follows:

 39